Meleuz (Mäläwez) is a town in the Republic of Bashkortostan, Russia, located on the bank of the Belaya River, 205 km south of Ufa. Population:

History 
It was a peasant village since 1786. In 1795, 434 people lived in the village, and in 1865, the village had 870 residents. The settlement started developing in the 1930s, when petroleum fields were discovered in the south of Bashkortostan and in the 1970s with the production of mineral fertilizers. It became a town in 1958.

Administrative and municipal status
Within the framework of administrative divisions, Meleuz serves as the administrative center of Meleuzovsky District, even though it is not a part of it. As an administrative division, it is incorporated separately as the town of republic significance of Meleuz—an administrative unit with the status equal to that of the districts. As a municipal division, the town of republic significance of Meleuz is incorporated within Meleuzovsky Municipal District as Meleuz Urban Settlement.

Climate
The climate of Meleuz is continental with relatively cold winters and hot summers.

References

Notes

Sources

Cities and towns in Bashkortostan
Ufa Governorate